Horsfall Stadium is a sports stadium just off Halifax Road in Bradford, West Yorkshire, England,  south-west of the city centre. It is the home of Bradford (Park Avenue) A.F.C.

It was originally built as a running track in 1931, and was upgraded for football when Bradford (Park Avenue) moved to the stadium in 1994. The track was upgraded to a synthetic surface at the same time.

In 2007, a number of improvements were made to the ground, including a new directors' and sponsors' room, a meeting room for the players and management, a new medical room, kit room and toilets. In addition, fully monitored CCTV has been installed to protect the facility and prevent vandalism. The main stand was also refurbished with seats, 1,800 of them coming from Lord's Cricket Ground. These changes were made due to new stringent ground grading requirements of the Football Association.

Avenue were ambitious to regain their league status and, in 2008, announced plans to move away from Horsfall, either to share Odsal Stadium with Bradford RLFC, or to move to a new stadium of their own.
However, as of May 2020 no building work has started.

References

External links
Bradford (Park Avenue) website
Bradford Airedale Athletics Club

Football venues in England
Sports venues in Bradford
Bradford (Park Avenue) A.F.C.
Sports venues completed in 1931